Walter Simon may refer to:

 Walter Simon (sinologist) (1893–1981), sinologist and librarian
 Walter Carl Simon (1886–1971), American World War I flying ace
 Walter Simon (philanthropist) (1857–1920), German banker, councillor and philanthropist
 Walter Simon (spy) (c. 1882–?), German World War II spy
 Walter Simon (painter) (1916–1979), American painter
 Walt Simon (1939–1997), American basketball player

See also

Walter Simons, German lawyer and politician